Samira Siahrostami is an Iranian computational chemist who is an associate professor at the University of Calgary. She designs new materials for catalysis, and develops computer simulations to understand electrochemical reactions. She was awarded the 2023 Canadian Society for Chemistry Tom Zeigler Award.

Early life and education 

Siahrostami grew up in Iran, where she completed her undergraduate and graduate degree in physical chemistry. She moved to the Technical University of Denmark for a postdoctoral position at the Center for Atomic-scale Material Design. After two years in Denmark, she joined Stanford University, where she worked with Jens Nørskov and started working on computational catalysis.

Research and career 
Siahrostami joined the University of Calgary as an assistant professor in 2018, and was promoted to associate professor in 2022. Her research involves computational chemistry for the design of new catalyst materials. Specifically, she studies the oxygen reduction reaction and the carbon dioxide reduction reaction. The oxygen reduction reaction limits the efficiency of fuel cells. Siahrostami hopes that her simulations can provide insight about the active sites for oxygen reduction, helping to develop new, more efficient cathode materials. The carbon dioxide reduction reaction offers hope for carbon dioxide mitigation, as well as providing a new strategy to produce chemicals and fuels. Siahrostami makes use of carbon-based nanomaterials for carbon dioxide reduction reaction catalysis. Some of the catalysts that she has predicted computationally have since been commercialised.

Alongside reduction reactions, Siahrostami is interested in hydrogen: both the synthesis of hydrogen peroxide for water purification and the production of clean hydrogen.

Awards and honours 
 2021 Royal Society of Chemistry John Jeyes Award 
 2023 Canadian Society for Chemistry Tom Ziegler Award
 2023 ACS Energy Letters Women at the Forefront of Energy

Selected publicatons

References 

Year of birth missing (living people)
Living people
Iranian women chemists
21st-century chemists
21st-century women scientists
Iranian chemists
Computational chemists
Technical University of Denmark alumni
Stanford University people
Academic staff of the University of Calgary